Sardigliano is a comune (municipality) in the Province of Alessandria in the Italian region Piedmont, located about  southeast of Turin and about  southeast of Alessandria.  

Sardigliano borders the following municipalities: Borghetto di Borbera, Cassano Spinola, Castellania Coppi, Garbagna, Sant'Agata Fossili, and Stazzano.

References

Cities and towns in Piedmont